Bíbrka is a city in western Ukraine, located in Lviv Raion of Lviv Oblast (region) about 29 km southeast of Lviv on H09. It hosts the administration of Bibrka urban hromada, one of the hromadas of Ukraine.

The town has been ruled at various points by the Kingdom of Poland, Polish–Lithuanian Commonwealth, the Austrian Empire, the Kingdom of Galicia and Lodomeria, the Russian Empire, Poland, the Soviet Union, and is now part of the Lviv Oblast in Ukraine; as a result Bibrka has several official and native names, including: Bóbrka (Polish/Russian), Prachnik (German), and Boiberik/Boyberke (Yiddish). The city has a population of 3,980.

Bibrka was the site of a Soviet prison and detention centre that detained Poles and others in the mid-20th century.

History 

From the first partition of Poland in 1772 until 1918, the town was part of the Austrian monarchy (Austria side after the compromise of 1867), head of the BOBRKA district, one of the 78 Bezirkshauptmannschaften in Austrian Galicia province (Crown land) in 1900. The fate of this province was then disputed between Poland and Russia, until the Peace of Riga in 1921. In the middle of 1941, approximately 2,000 Jews lived in Birbrka. The Germans commenced their occupation of the town during World War II on June 30, 1941. In 1942, the Germans created a ghetto for the remaining 1,500 - 1,900 Jews who had not been deported to the Bełzec extermination camp. Approximately 300 Jews died in the ghetto due to disease and illness. The ghetto was liquidated on April 13, 1943, during which over 1,300 Jews were killed on a site in the nearby village of Volove.

The region was annexed by the Soviet Union in 1945.

Until 18 July 2020, Bibrka belonged to Peremyshliany Raion. The raion was abolished in July 2020 as part of the administrative reform of Ukraine, which reduced the number of raions of Lviv Oblast to seven. The area of Peremyshliany Raion was merged into Lviv Raion.

Gallery

References

External links
 Bóbrka (Bibrka) in the Geographical Dictionary of the Kingdom of Poland (1880)
JewishGen ShtetLinks, Bóbrka by Bev Shulster. Retrieved 25 May 2006
My Bibrka 
 

Cities in Lviv Oblast
Kingdom of Galicia and Lodomeria
Lwów Voivodeship
Shtetls
Cities of district significance in Ukraine
Holocaust locations in Ukraine